The Église Saint-Philippe-du-Roule is a Roman Catholic church located at 154 Rue du Faubourg-Saint-Honoré in the 8th arrondissement of Paris. Resembling a Roman temple. it was built in the style of Neoclassicism between 1774 and 1784 by architect Jean-François Chalgrin best known for his design of the Arc de Triomphe. It was enlarged in 1845 by the architects Étienne-Hippolyte Godde and Victor Baltard.

History
The predecessor of the church was a small chapel attached to a hospital for leprosy,  which was demolished in 1739. It was located in the village of Roule, which had been joined to Paris in 1722, and was becoming a fashionable residential neighborhood. King Louis X of France wished to give the community a suitable church. The architect Jean-François Chalgrin, who later became famous for his plan for the Arc de Triomphe, was chosen for the project. Chalgrin made a design  in the neoclassical style, very popular in the period, with a facade resemblng a Roman temple. Construction lasted from 1774 until 1784. Chalgrin's original plan called for two bell towers, but these were dropped because of a shortage of funds.

During the French Revolution the church was closed, but the building was returned to the church in 1792, and became the parish church once again in  1802. The population of the neighborhood continued to grow, and an enlargement of the church was needed. Beginning in 1845 the architect Etienne-Hippolyte Godde (1781-1869) added a disambulatory with classical columns and a new  chapel behind the altar in the west end of the church. This plan, based on the early Paleochristian churches in Rome, became very popular during the French Restoration.  They added a lavishly decorated axial chapel, dedicated to the Virgin Mary,  at the east end of the church.

Later in the 19th century, colorful stained glass windows depicting events in the lives of Saint Philip and Saint John, were added along the side aisles; these were the work of Emile Hirsch (1832-1904).

Exterior 
The exterior of the church is modelled after the early Christian basilcas in Rome, The peristyle over the portal is supported by four columns of the Doric order, and is topped by a triangular pediment. The sculpture on the pediment is decorated with an allegorical figure representing Religion, holding a chalice and a cross. The sculpture was made by Francois-Joseph Duret (1732-1816). The inscription below says that the church is dedicated to Saint Philip the Apostle.

Nave and Choir  
The nave and choir are ringed by columns with capitals of the Ionic order, giving it a formal appearance, but this is offset by the colorful and dramatic art in the room. The caissons of the rounded ceiling, decorated with floral elements, are actually wood painted to resemble stone." 

In the rotunda above the choir is the centerpiece of the art in the church, a painting by Theodore Chassériau (1819-1856), dramatically depicting The descent of Christ from the Cross. The body of Christ is held up by mourners, who include the Virgin Mary in  a central position, and an assembly of Saints. The colors of the painting and dramatic positions of the mourners provide a striking contrast to the formal classical architecture around them.

Chapel of the Virgin 
THe Chapel of the Virgin, behind the altar in the apae of the church, is the most highly-decorated part of the church, with sculpture and paintings illustrating the life of the Virgim Mary. THe lower row of aintings of Claudius Jacquand s(1804-1878) how scenes from the life of the Virgin, while the upper paintings illustrate the litanies. The painting by Jacquand the vault over the altar depicts Christ crowning the Virgin. Christ is accompanied by Saint Philip and Saint John. 

The centerpiece of the chapel is a marble statue of the Virgin Mary and child, called "Our Lady of All the Graces", by  Charles-François Lebœuf Nanteuil (1792-1865).

Stained Glass 
The bays along the outer outer aisles are not occupied by chapels, and instead are filled with colorful stained glass windows in the Art Nouveau style from the end of the 19th century. The windows in the aisles illustrate scenes from the lives of Saint Philip the Apostle and Saint John the Apostle.  These were made by Emile Hirsch (1832-1904). A series of windows depicting saints was created from paintings by Albert Maignan in 1894.  A colorful circular stained glass is placed over the altar in the Chapel of the Virgin.

Organ 
The organ of the church is located in a niche under the vaults over the tribune, above the portal to the nave. It was built by the firm of Cavaillé-Coll-Mutin in 1903.

Notes and citations

Bibliography (in French) 
Dumoulin, Aline; Ardisson, Alexandra; Maingard, Jérôme; Antonello, Murielle; Églises de Paris (2010), Éditions Massin, Issy-Les-Moulineaux,  (in French)

External Links (in French)  
  Website of the church
  Link to the French Wikipedia article on the church
  Article in patrimoine-histoire.fr, on the history and art of the church

Roman Catholic churches in the 8th arrondissement of Paris